Gordon T. Miniely  (born October 25, 1939) was a politician from Alberta, Canada.

Miniely was elected to represent the electoral district of Edmonton-Centre for the Progressive Conservatives in the 1971 Alberta general election. He served two terms the assembly before retiring in 1979.

Miniely served in the cabinet under Premier Peter Lougheed. His portfolios were Provincial Treasurer and Minister of hospitals and medical care.

References

External links
Gordon Miniely guest introduction, Alberta Legislative Assembly April 20, 2004
Legislative Assembly of Alberta Membership Listing

Progressive Conservative Association of Alberta MLAs
Living people
1939 births
Members of the Executive Council of Alberta